Diprotodon (Ancient Greek: "two protruding front teeth") is an extinct genus of marsupial from the Pleistocene of Australia, containing one species, D. optatum. The earliest finds date to 1.77 million to 780,000 years ago, but most specimens are dated to after 110,000 years ago. Its massive fossils were first unearthed in 1830 in Wellington Caves, New South Wales, before any serious scientists were active on the continent, and were variably guessed to belong to rhinos, elephants, hippos, or dugongs. Diprotodon, formally described by English naturalist Richard Owen in 1838, was the first named Australian fossil mammal, and set Owen on a path to becoming the foremost authority of his time on other marsupials and Australian megafauna so enigmatic to European science.

Diprotodon is the largest known marsupial to have ever lived, far dwarfing its closest living relatives, wombats and koalas. Females were much smaller than males. Diprotodon supported itself on elephant-like legs to traverse long distances, and colonised most of Australia. The digits were weak, and most of the weight was probably borne on the wrists and ankles. The hindpaws angled inward at 130°. Such power would have permitted it to eat vegetation in bulk, crunching and grinding on mixed browse (twigs, buds, and leaves of woody plants) with its bilophodont teeth.

It is the only known marsupial (and metatherian) identified to make seasonal migrations, trekking through a wide range of habitats in large (usually female) herds to search out food and water. Diprotodon may have formed polygynous societies, possibly using its powerful incisors to battle for mates or fend off predators, namely the largest known marsupial carnivore, Thylacoleo carnifex. Being a marsupial, the mother may have raised a joey in a pouch on her belly, probably one facing backwards like in wombats.

However, there is no solid direct evidence of Aboriginal Australians and Diprotodon (or any Pleistocene mammalian megafauna) interacting at all. Diprotodon has been conjectured to be the subject of some aboriginal mythological figures (most notably, the bunyip) and aboriginal rock artworks, but these are unconfirmable.

Research history

In 1830, farmer George Ranken found a diverse fossil assemblage while exploring Wellington Caves, New South Wales. This was the first major site of extinct Australian megafauna. It was excavated when Ranken returned later in a formal expedition headed by Major Thomas Mitchell.

At the time these massive fossils were discovered, it was generally thought that the fossil assemblage represented rhinos, elephants, hippos, or dugongs. They were not formally described until Mitchell brought them in 1837 to his former colleague, English naturalist Richard Owen, while in England publishing his journal. In 1838, while studying a piece of a right mandible with an incisor, Owen compared the tooth to that of a wombat and a hippo; he wrote to Mitchell designating it as a new genus: Diprotodon. Mitchell published the correspondence in his journal. Owen formally described Diprotodon in volume 2 without mentioning a species, but in volume 1, he listed the name Diprotodon optatum, making that the type species. Diprotodon means "two protruding front teeth" in Ancient Greek, and optatum is Latin for "desire" or "wish". It was the first ever Australian fossil mammal described. In 1844, Owen replaced the name D. optatum with "D. australis". Owen only used optatum the one time, and the acceptance of its apparent replacement "australis" has historically varied widely, but optatum is now standard.

In 1843, Mitchell was sent more Diprotodon fossils from the recently settled Darling Downs, and relayed them to Owen. Owen believed Diprotodon was an elephant related to or synonymous with Mastodon or Deinotherium, having interpreted the incisors as tusks, as well as comparing the flattening (anteroposterior compression) of the femur to the condition in elephants and rhinos, and the raised ridges of the molar to the grinding surfaces of elephant teeth. Later that year, he formally synonymised Diprotodon with Deinotherium as Dinotherium Australe, which he recanted in 1844 after German naturalist Ludwig Leichhardt pointed out that the incisors clearly belong to a marsupial. Owen, nonetheless, still classified the molars from Wellington as Mastodon australis. He also continued to describe Diprotodon as likely elephantine. In 1847, a nearly complete skull and skeleton was recovered from the Darling Downs, the latter confirming this characterisation. The massive skeleton, while on public display in Sydney, attracted a large audience. Leichhardt believed the animal was aquatic and suggested in 1844 that it might still be alive in an undiscovered tropical area towards the interior, but as the European land exploration of Australia progressed, he became certain it was extinct. Owen would go on to become the foremost authority of Australian palaeontology of his time, mostly working with marsupials.

Huge assemblages of rather complete Diprotodon fossils have been unearthed in dry lake- or riverbeds, the largest assemblage from Lake Callabonna. Fossils were first noticed here by an aboriginal stockman working on a sheep property to the east. The owners, the Ragless brothers, notified the South Australian Museum which hired Australian geologist Henry Hurst. He reported an enormous wealth of fossil material, and was subsequently given £250 in 1893 to excavate the site, turning over as many as 360 Diprotodon individuals over a few acres. More were uncovered soon after excavation was restarted in the 1970s. American palaeontologist Richard H. Tedford suggested that multiple herds of these animals at different points in time got stuck in the mud during their crossing while the water was low during dry seasons.

In addition to D. optatum, several other species were erected through the 19th century, often from single specimens, on the basis of some subtle anatomical variations. Among the variations was size difference, and adult Diprotodon specimens come in two distinct size ranges. In their 1975 review of Australian fossil mammals, Australian palaeontologists J. A. Mahoney and William David Lindsay Ride did not ascribe this to sexual dimorphism because males and females among modern wombat and koala species (its closest living relatives) are skeletally indistinguishable, so they assumed the same would have been true for extinct relatives, including Diprotodon.
These other species are:
D. annextans, erected in 1861 by Irish palaeontologist Frederick McCoy based on some teeth and a partial mandible near Colac, Victoria; the name may be a typo of annectens which means linking or joining, because he characterised the species as combining traits from Diprotodon and Nototherium;
D. minor, erected in 1862 by Thomas Huxley based on a partial palate; in 1991, Australian palaeontologist Peter Murray suggested classifying large specimens as D. optatum and smaller ones as "D. minor";
D. longiceps, erected in 1865 by McCoy as a replacement for "D. annextans";
D. bennettii, erected in 1873 by German naturalist Gerard Krefft based on a nearly complete mandible collected by naturalists George Bennet and Georgina King near Gowrie, New South Wales; and
D. loderi, erected in 1873 by Krefft based on a partial palate collected by Andrew Loder near Murrurundi, New South Wales.
In 2008, Australian palaeontologist Gilbert Price opted to recognise only one species, D. optatum, based most notably on a lack of dental differences among these supposed species, and suggested that it was likely that Diprotodon was indeed sexually dimorphic, with the male probably being the larger form.

Classification

Phylogeny

Diprotodon is a marsupial in the order Diprotodontia, suborder Vombatiformes (wombats and koalas), and infraorder Vombatomorphia (wombats and allies). It is unclear how different groups of vombatiformes are related to each other as the most completely known members, living or extinct, are exceptionally derived (highly specialised forms which are quite different from their last common ancestor).

In 1872, American mammalogist Theodore Gill erected the superfamily Diprotodontoidea and family Diprotodontidae to house Diprotodon. New species were added to both groups in subsequent years. By the 1960s, the first diprotodontoids dating to before the Pliocene were being discovered, better elucidating how they are related to each other. Because of this, in 1967, American palaeontologist Ruben A. Stirton subdivided Diprotodontoidea into one family, Diprotodontidae, with four subfamilies: Diprotodontinae (containing Diprotodon among others), Nototheriinae, Zygomaturinae, and Palorchestinae. In 1977, Australian palaeontologist Michael Archer synonymised Nototheriinae with Diprotodontinae, and in 1978, Archer and Australian palaeontologist Alan Bartholomai elevated Palorchestinae to family level as Palorchestidae, leaving Diprotodontoidea with two families (Diprotodontidae and Palorchestidae), and Diprotodontidae with two subfamilies (Diprotodontinae and Zygomaturinae).

Below is the Diprotodontoidea family tree according to Australian palaeontologists Karen H. Black and Brian Mackness, 1999 (top), and Vombatiformes family tree according to Beck et al. 2020 (bottom):

Evolution

Diprotodontidae is the most diverse family in Vombatomorphia, better adapted to the spreading dry and open landscapes over the last tens of millions of years than other groups in the infraorder (living or extinct). Diprotodon has been found in every Australian state, making it the most widespread Australian megafauna in the fossil record. The oldest vombatomorph (and vombatiform) is Mukupirna, identified in 2020 from Oligocene deposits of the South Australian Namba Formation dating to 26–25 million years ago.

Both diprotodontines and zygomaturines were both apparently quite diverse over the Late Oligocene to Early Miocene roughly 23 million years ago (though the familial and subfamilial classifications of diprotodontoids from this time period is debated). Compared to zygomaturines, diprotodontines were rare during the Miocene, the only identified genus being Pyramios. By the Late Miocene, diprotodontians became the most common marsupial order in fossil sites, a dominance which endures to the present day; at this point, the most prolific diprotodontians were diprotodontids and kangaroos. Diprotodontidae also began a gigantism trend, along with several other marsupials, probably a response to the lower quality plant foods available in a drying climate, requiring them to consume much more. Gigantism appears to have evolved independently six times among the vombatiform lineages. Diprotodontine diversity returned in the Pliocene, and Diprotodontidae reached peak diversity with seven genera, coinciding with the spread of open forests. In 1977, Archer suggested that Diprotodon directly evolved from the smaller Euryzygoma, which has been discovered in Pliocene deposits of eastern Australia predating 2.5 million years ago.

In general, there is poor resolution on the ages of Australian fossil sites, and while the geochronology of Diprotodon is one of best for Australian megafauna, it is still quite incomplete and the majority of remains sit undated. The earliest (indirectly dated) Diprotodon fossils were reported by Price and Australian palaeontologist Katarzyna Piper from the Nelson Bay Formation at Nelson Bay, New South Wales, which dates to 1.77 million to 780,000 years ago during the Early Pleistocene. The remains are notably smaller than Late Pleistocene Diprotodon by 8–17%, but they are otherwise indistinguishable. The oldest directly dated fossils come from the Boney Bite site at Floraville, New South Wales. They were deposited approximately 340,000 years ago during the Middle Pleistocene based on U-series dating and luminescence dating of quartz and orthoclase. Floraville is the only identified Middle Pleistocene site in tropical northern Australia. Beyond these, almost all dated material comes from Marine Isotope Stage 5 (MIS5) or younger (after 110,000 years ago) during the Late Pleistocene.

Description

Skull

Diprotodon has a long and narrow skull. Like other marsupials, the top of the skull of Diprotodon is flat or depressed over the small braincase, as well as the sinuses of the frontal bone. Like many other giant vombatiformes, the frontal sinuses are extensive; in a specimen from Bacchus Marsh, they take up —roughly 25% of skull volume—whereas the brain only occupies —only 4% skull volume. Marsupials tend to have smaller brain to body mass ratios than placental mammals, becoming more disparate the bigger the animal, which could be a response to conserve energy (as the brain is a calorically expensive organ) or is proportional to the maternal metabolic rate (which is much less in marsupials since they do not have to gestate for as long). The expanded sinuses increase the surface area available for the temporalis muscle to attach (important for biting and chewing) to compensate for a deflated braincase as a result of a proportionally smaller brain. They may have also helped dissipate stresses produced by biting more efficiently across the skull.

The occipital bone, the back of the skull, slopes forward at a 45° angle, as opposed to most modern marsupials where it is vertical. The base of the occipital is heavily thickened. The occipital condyles (a pair of bones which connect the skull with the vertebral column) are semi-circle shaped, with the bottom half being narrower than the top. The inner border (which forms the foramen magnum, where the spinal cord feeds through) is thin and well-defined. The top margin of the foramen magnum is somewhat flattened rather than arched. The foramen expands backwards towards the inlet, especially vertically, and is more reminiscent of a short neural canal (the tube running through a vertebral centrum where the spinal cord passes through) than a foramen magnum.

There is a sagittal crest extending across the midline of the skull from the supraoccipital (the top of the occipital bone) to the interorbital region (between the eyes on the top of the head). The orbit (eye socket) is small and oval-shaped vertically. The nasal bones slightly curve upwards until near their endpoint, where they begin to curve down, giving the bones somewhat of an S-shaped profile. Like many marsupials, most of the nasal septum is made of bone rather than cartilage. The nose would have been quite mobile. The height of the skull from the peak of the occipital bone to the end of the nasals is strikingly almost uniform, but the end of the nasals is the tallest point. The zygomatic arch (cheek bone) is strong and deep like in kangaroos, but unlike koalas or wombats, and also extends all the way from the supraoccipital.

Jaws

Like kangaroos and wombats, there is a gap in between the jointing of the palate (roof of the mouth) and the maxilla (upper jaw) behind the last molar, which is filled by the medial pterygoid plate. This would have been the insertion for the medial pterygoid muscle relevant to closing the jaw. Like many grazers, the masseter muscle (also responsible for closing the jaw) seems to have been the dominant jaw muscle, and a probable large temporal muscle compared to the lateral pterygoid muscle may indicate, unlike wombats, a limited range of jaw motion side-to-side (i.e., Diprotodon would have been better at crushing rather than grinding food). The insertion of the masseter is placed forwards, in front of the orbits, which could have allowed better control over the incisors. Overall, Diprotodon chewing strategy appears to align more with kangaroos than wombats, with a powerful vertical crunch followed by a transverse grinding motion.

Like other marsupials, the ramus of the mandible (the portion that goes up to connect with the skull) angles inward. The condyloid process (which connects the jaw to the skull) is similar to that of a koala. The ramus is straight and extends almost vertically, thickening as it approaches the body of the mandible (where the teeth are). The depth of the body of the mandible increases somewhat from the last to the first molar. The mandibular symphysis (which fuses the two halves of the mandible) is strong, beginning at the frontmost end of the third molar; this would prevent either half of the mandible from moving independently of the other, unlike kangaroos which use this ability to better control their incisors.

Teeth

There is a long diastema (gap) separating the incisors from the molars.

The incisors are chisel-like (scalpriform). The first incisors in both jaws grew continuously throughout the animal's life, like wombats and rodents, but the other two upper incisors did not. This combination is not seen in any living marsupial. The cross-section of the upper incisors is circular. The first incisor is convex and curves outwards, but the other two are concave. The lower incisor has a faint upward curve but is otherwise straight, and it has an oval cross-section.

The premolars and molars are bilophodont, and each features two distinct lophs (ridges). The premolar is triangular and about half the size of the molars. The necks of the lophs are coated in cementum like kangaroos. Unlike kangaroos, there is no connecting ridge between the lophs. The peaks of these lophs have a thick enamel coating, which thins towards the base. This could wear away with use and expose the dentine layer, and beneath that osteodentine. Like the first premolar of other marsupials, the first molar of Diprotodon and wombats is the only tooth that is replaced.

Vertebrae
Diprotodon had five cervical (neck) vertebrae. The atlas, the first cervical (C1), has a pair of deep cavities for insertion of the occipital condyles. The diaphophyses (an upward-angled projection on either the side of the vertebra) of the atlas are relatively short and thick, and overall resemble those of wombats and koalas. The articular surface (the part that joints to another vertebra) of the axis (C2) is slightly concave on the front side, and flat on the back side. Like kangaroos, the axis has a low subtriangular hypophysis (projecting vertically from the underside of the vertebra) and a proportionally long odontoid (a projection from the axis which fits into the atlas), but the neural spine (which project vertically the topside of the vertebra) is more forwards. The remaining cervicals lack a hypophysis. Like kangaroos, C3 and C4 have a shorter and more compressed neural spine, which is supported by a low ridge along its midline in the front and the back. The neural spine of C5 is narrower but thicker, and is supported by stronger though shorter ridges.

Diprotodon probably had 13 dorsal vertebrae and 14 pairs of closely-spaced ribs. Like many other mammals, the dorsals initially decrease in breadth and then expand before connecting to the lumbar vertebrae. The front dorsals unusually match the short proportions of the cervicals, and the articular surface is flat. At the beginning of the series, the neural spine is broad and angled forward, and is also supported by a low ridge along its midline in the front and the back. Later on, the neural spine is angled backwards, and bifurcates (splits into two). Among mammals, bifurcation of the neural spine is only seen in elephants and humans, and even then, only in a few of the cervicals, not in the dorsals. Compared to wombats and kangaroos, the neural arch is proportionally taller. Like in elephants, the epiphysial plates (growth plates) and the neural arch (where the neural spine is attached to) are anchylosed (very rigid in regard to the vertebral centrum), which serve to support the animal's immense weight.

Like most marsupials, Diprotodon likely had six lumbar vertebrae. They retain a proportionally tall neural arch, but not the diapophyses, though L1 can retain a small protuberance on one side where a diapophysis would be in a dorsal vertebra; this has been documented in kangaroos among other mammals. The length of each vertebra increases along the series, so the lumbar series may have bent downward.

Like other marsupials, Diprotodon had two sacral vertebrae. The base of the neural spines of these two were ossified (fused) together.

Limbs

Girdles
The general proportions of the scapula (shoulder blade) align more closely with more basal vertebrates such as monotremes, birds, reptiles, or fish, rather than marsupials or placentals. It is triangular and proportionally narrow, but unlike most mammals with a triangular scapula, the arm attaches to top of the scapula, and the subspinous fossa (the fossa, a depression, below the spine of the scapula) increases towards the arm joint instead of decreasing. The glenoid cavity (where the arm connects) is oval shaped like in most mammals.

Unlike other marsupials, the ilia (the large wings of the pelvis) are lamelliform (short and broad, with a flat surface instead of an iliac fossa). Lamelliform ilia have only been recorded in elephants, sloths, and apes, though these groups all have a much longer sacral vertebra series (marsupials are restricted to two sacral vertebrae). Nonetheless, the ilia provided strong muscle attachments which were probably oriented and used much the same as in an elephant. The sacroiliac joint (where the pelvis connects to the spine) is at a 35° angle in reference to the long axis of the ilium. The ischia (which form part of the hip socket) are thick and rounded tailwards, but taper off and diverge towards the socket, unlike in kangaroos where the ischia proceed almost parallel to each other. They were not connected to the vertebra. The hip socket itself is well rounded and almost hemispherical.

Long bones
Unlike most marsupials, the humerus is rather straight (as opposed to S-shaped), and the trochlea of the humerus (at the elbow joint) is not perforated. The ridges for muscle attachments are poorly developed, which seems to have been compensated by the powerful forearms. Similarly, the condyles where the radius and ulna (the forearm bones) connect maintain their rounded shape and are quite similarly sized, unusually reminiscent of the condyles between the femur and the tibia and fibula in the leg of a kangaroo.

Like elephants, the femur of Diprotodon is straight, compressed anteroposteriorly (from headside to tailside), and the walls of the femur are prodigiously thickened, strongly constricting the medullary cavity (where the bone marrow is). The proximal end (part closest to the hip joint) is notably long, broad, and deep. The femoral head projects up far from the greater trochanter. Like kangaroos, the greater trochanter is split into two lobes. The femoral neck is roughly the same diameter as the femoral head. Like kangaroos, the condyle for the fibula is excavated out, but the condyle for the tibia is well rounded and hemispheric. Like many other marsupials, the tibia is twisted and the tibial malleolus (on the ankle) is reduced.

Paws
Diprotodon has five digits on either paw. Like other plantigrade walkers (the paws were flat on the ground), the wrist and ankle would have been largely rigid and inflexible. The digits overall are proportionally weak, so the paws probably had a lot of padding in life. Similarly, the digits do not seem to have been engaged much in weight bearing.

The forepaw was strong, and the shape of the wrist bones are quite similar to those of kangaroos. Like other vombatiformes, the metacarpals (which connect the fingers to the wrist) are broadly similar to those of kangaroos and allies. The pisiform bone is enlarged, and takes up half the jointing surface of the ulna. The fifth digit on the forepaw is the largest.

The digits of the hindpaws turn inwards from the ankle at a 130° angle. The second and third metatarsals (the metatarsals connect the toes to the ankle) are significantly reduced, which may mean these digits were syndactylous (fused) like in all modern diprotodontians. The first, fourth, and fifth digits are enlarged. The toes are each about the same length, except the fifth one which is much stouter.

Size

Diprotodon is the largest known marsupial to have ever lived. Accounting for cartilaginous intervertebral discs, Diprotodon may have been 20% longer than the reconstructed skeletons, exceeding .

As researchers were formulating predictive body mass equations for fossil species, efforts were largely constrained to eutherian mammals as opposed to marsupials. The first attempt at estimating the living weight of Diprotodon was Peter Murray in his 1991 review of the megafauna of Pleistocene Australia. He made an estimate of  using cranial and dental measurements, though conceded it was probably not a very precise one. This made Diprotodon the largest herbivore in Australia. In 2001, Canadian biologist Gary Burness and colleagues did a linear regression between the largest herbivores and carnivores (living or extinct) from every continent (for Australia: Diprotodon, Varanus priscus, and Thylacoleo carnifex) vs. the landmass area of their continent, and another regression between the daily food intake of living creatures vs. the landmass of their continents. He calculated the food requirements of Diprotodon was 50–60% smaller than expected for Australia's landmass, which he believed was a result of a generally lower metabolism in marsupials compared to placentals (up to 20% lower) and sparser nutritious vegetation compared to other continents. That is, the maximum attainable body size is capped much lower than on other continents.

In 2003, Australian palaeontologist Stephen Wroe and colleagues took a more sophisticated approach to body mass than Murray's estimate. They made a regression between the minimum circumference of the femora and humeri of 18 quadrupedal marsupials and 32 placentals vs. body mass, and then input 17 Diprotodon long bones into their predictive model.

Paleobiology

Diet

Like modern megaherbivores, most evidently the African elephant, the Pleistocene Australian megafauna likely had a profound effect on the vegetation, limiting the spread of forest cover and woody plants. Carbon isotope analysis suggests Diprotodon fed on a broad range of foods, and, like kangaroos, was consuming both C3 (well-watered trees, shrubs, and grasses) and C4 (arid grasses) plants. Carbon isotope analyses on Diprotodon from the Cuddie Springs site in units SU6 (possibly 45,000 years old) and SU9 (350,000 to 570,000 years old) indicate that Diprotodon adopted a somewhat more varied seasonal diet over time as Australia dried, but all around any change was subtle. In contrast, contemporary kangaroos or wombats evinced major dietary shifts or specialisations towards, respectively, C3 and C4 plants. The fossilised gut contents (incompletely digested) of one 53,000 year old individual from Lake Callabonna show its last meal consisted of young leaves, stalks, and twigs.

The molars of Diprotodon are a simple bilophodont shape. Kangaroos use their bilophodont teeth to grind low-fibre (not too tough) plants as a browser, as well as grass as a grazer. Kangaroos which predominantly graze have specialised molars to resist the abrasiveness of grass, but such adaptations are not exhibited in Diprotodon, so Diprotodon may have had a mixed diet similar to a browsing wallaby. It may have chewed like them too, beginning with a vertical crunch before grinding transversely, as opposed to wombats which only grind transversely. Similar to many large ungulates (hoofed mammals), the jaws of Diprotodon were better suited for crushing rather than grinding, which would have permitted it to process vegetation in bulk.

In 2016, Australian biologists Alana Sharpe and Thomas Rich estimated the maximum possible bite force of Diprotodon using finite element analysis. Though these are likely overestimates, the jaws of Diprotodon were still exceptionally strong, which would have allowed it to consume a broad range of plants, including tough, fibrous grasses.

Migration and sociality

In 2017, Price and colleagues determined that Diprotodon made seasonal migrations, probably in search of food or watering holes. Price and colleagues did this by measuring the strontium isotope ratio (87Sr/86Sr) at various points along the Diprotodon incisor QMF3452 from the Darling Downs, and matching those ratios to the ratios of sites across that region. This trek parallels the mammalian mass migrations of modern day East Africa.

Diprotodon is the only identified metatherian that seasonally migrated between two places. A few modern marsupials, such as the red kangaroo, have been documented making migrations should the need arise, but it is not a seasonal occurrence. Since Diprotodon could do it, it is not unlikely that other Pleistocene Australian megafauna did it as well.

Diprotodon apparently moved in large herds. Possible fossilised herds, most commonly unearthed in southeastern Australia, seem to be either predominantly or entirely female (sometimes in tow with juveniles). Such sexual segregation is normally seen in polygynous species, a common social organisation among modern megaherbivores which features an entirely female herd save for their young and the dominant male; the herd breeds exclusively with this male. Similarly, the skull is adapted to handling much higher stresses than what resulted from bite alone, so Diprotodon therefore may have subjected its teeth or jaws to more strenuous activities than just chewing, such as battling other Diprotodon for mates, or fending off predators, using the incisors. Like modern red and grey kangaroos (which also sexually segregate), bachelor herds of Diprotodon seem to have been less tolerant to drought conditions than female herds on account of their larger size and nutritional requirements.

Gait

The locomotion of an extinct animal can be inferred using fossil trackways, which seldom ever preserve in Australia over the Cenozoic. Only the trackways of humans, kangaroos, vombatids, Diprotodon, and the diprotodontid Euowenia have been identified. Diprotodon trackways have been found at Lake Callabonna and the Victorian Volcanic Plain grasslands. The diprotodontid manus (forepaw) print is semicircular, and the pes (hindpaw) is reniform (kidney-shaped). Owing to proportionally small digits, most of the weight was borne on the carpus and tarsus (the bones connecting to respectively the wrist and the ankle). Diprotodontines seem to have had a much more erect gait, an adaptation to long-distance travel similar to elephants, rather than the more sprawling posture of wombats and zygomaturines, though there are no fossil trackways of the latter to verify their reconstructed standing posture.

Its posture was much more sprawled than that from Callabonna, aligning more with what might be expected of Zygomaturus, so the animal may have been a female carrying a large joey in her pouch, the added weight on the stomach altering the gait. The animal seems to have hesitated stepping down from the first sand bar on its path, with the right pes making three overlapping prints here while shuffling around. The trackway vanishes for a  stretch, and reappears while the animal seemingly is stepping on wet sediment.

Life history

Marsupials also give birth at an earlier point in foetal development, relying on lactation to facilitate most of the joey's development; investing in lactation over pregnancy duration can be advantageous in a highly seasonal and unpredictable climate to minimise maternal nutritional requirements (as pregnancy is much more energetically expensive). Consequently, marsupials cannot support as large a litter size or as short a generation time.

Based on the relation between female body size and life history in kangaroos, a  Diprotodon female would have gestated for six to eight weeks, and given birth to a single  joey. Given its massive size, Diprotodon may not have sat down to give birth as smaller marsupials do, possibly standing up instead. Like koalas and wombats, the pouch may have faced backwards, so the joey could crawl down across its mother's abdomen to enter, and then attach itself to a teat until it could see (perhaps 260 days) and thermoregulate. It would have permanently left the pouch after 860 days, and suckled until reaching  after four or five years.

In large kangaroos, females usually reach sexual maturity and enter oestrus soon after weaning, and males need double the time to reach sexual maturity. A similar pattern could have been exhibited in Diprotodon. Assuming a lifespan of up to 50 years, a female Diprotodon could have given birth eight times.

Palaeoecology
Diprotodon existed during the Pleistocene, and spread out across the entire Australian continent by the Late Pleistocene, especially following MIS5 approximately 110,000 years ago. The onset of the Quaternary glaciation and the continuous advance and retreat of glaciers at the poles created fluctuating and extreme climatic swings elsewhere. In Australia, the warmer, wetter interglacials were received by forests and woodlands, and the colder, dryer glacial periods were more conducive to grasslands and deserts. Nonetheless, the continent progressively became dryer and dryer over time as the Asian monsoons became less influential over Australia, with the vast interior turning arid and sandy by 500,000 years ago; the mega-lakes (once prominent especially during interglacials over northwestern Australia) drying up; and the rainforests of eastern Australia gradually retreating. Aridity has hastened over the last 100,000 years, especially after 60,000 years ago with surging El Niño–Southern Oscillation.

The continent-wide distribution of Diprotodon indicates that herds trekked across almost any habitat Australia had to offer, much like modern African elephants south of the Sahara. Diprotodon was a member of a diverse assemblage of megafauna endemic to Pleistocene Australia, which also included creatures such as the thylacine, modern kangaroos, sthenurines (giant short-faced kangaroos), a diversity of modern and giant koala and wombat species, the tapir-like Palorchestes, the giant turtle Meiolania, and the giant bird Genyornis. Diprotodon coexisted with the diprotodontid Zygomaturus trilobus, which appears to have clung to the forests, whereas Diprotodon foraged the expanding grasslands and woodlands. Other contemporary dipotodontids (Hulitherium, Z. nimborensia, and Maokopia) were insular forms restricted to the forests of New Guinea.

Given its massive size, Diprotodon would have been a tough adversary for native carnivores. It contended with the largest known marsupial predator, Thylacoleo carnifex, and while Diprotodon fossils gnawed or bitten by T. carnifex have been identified, it is unclear if the  marsupial predator was powerful enough to take down an animal surpassing . Given that the modern jaguar, at half the size of T. carnifex, can bring down a  bull, it is not impossible that T. carnifex could have killed smaller-sized Diprotodon. Similar to recent kangaroos with thylacines or quolls, juvenile Diprotodon may have been at high risk to T. carnifex predation, as T. carnifex and juvenile Diprotodon fossils have been recovered from the same caves. The largest predators of the continent were reptiles, most notably the saltwater crocodile and the now-extinct crocodiles Paludirex and Quinkana, and the giant lizard megalania (Varanus priscus). At  in length, megalania was the largest carnivore of Pleistocene Australia.

Extinction
As part of the Quaternary extinction event, Diprotodon and every other land animal heavier than  went extinct from Australia. The timing, and thus the exact cause, are unclear because in general there is poor resolution on the ages of Australian fossil sites. Since their discovery, the extinction of the Australian megafauna has usually been blamed on the deteriorating climate or overhunting by the first Aboriginal Australians. In 2001, Australian palaeontologist Richard Roberts and colleagues dated 28 major fossil sites across the continent, and were able to provide a precise date for megafaunal extinction. They found that most disappear from the fossil record by 80,000 years ago, but Diprotodon (in addition to the giant wombat Phascolonus, Thylacoleo, and the short-faced kangaroos Procoptodon, Protemnodon, and Simosthenurus) was identified at Ned's Gully, Queensland, and Kudjal Yolgah Cave, Western Australia, which they dated to respectively 47 and 46 thousand years ago. Thus, the megafauna all died out probably between about 41 to 50 thousand years ago. There also seems to have been a rather diverse assemblage of megafauna just before their extinction, and all populations across the continent (or at least in western and eastern Australia) died out at about the same time. As of 2021, there is still no solid evidence of megafauna surviving past approximately 40,000 years ago. Their latest occurrence (including Diprotodon) is recorded at South Walker Creek mine in the northeast, at about 40,100 ± 1,700 years ago.

At the time Roberts et al. published their paper, the earliest evidence of human activity was 56±4 thousand years old, which was rather close to their calculated date, so they hypothesised that human hunting had eradicated the last megafauna within about 10 thousand years of coexistence. Human hunting had earlier also been blamed for the extinction of North American and New Zealand megafauna. Human activity had then been generally regarded as the main driver of Australian megafaunal extinction, especially because the megafauna had survived multiple extreme drought periods during glacial periods, and at the time there did not seem to be any evidence of unusually extreme climate during this window. Given how slowly marsupials reproduce, even limited megafaunal hunting may have severely weakened their population.

In 2005, American geologist Gifford Miller noticed that fire abruptly becomes much more common about 45,000 years ago, which he ascribed to aboriginal fire-stick farmers, who would have regularly started controlled burns to clear highly productive forests and grasslands. He believed that this radically altered the vegetational landscape, and promulgated the expanse of the modern day fire-resilient scrub, at the expense of the megafauna. Subsequent studies have had trouble firmly linking controlled burns and major ecological collapse. The frequency of fire could have also increased as a consequence of megafaunal extinction, as total plant consumption plummeted, leading to faster fuel buildup. 

In 2017, the human-occupied Madjedbebe rockshelter by the northern Australian coast was dated to about 65,000 years, which meant that humans and megafauna had coexisted for over 20,000 years, casting strong doubt on the unilateral role of human activity in megafaunal extinction. Further, in the 2010s, several ecological studies were published in support of major drought conditions coinciding with the final megafaunal extinctions. Therefore, their demise may have been the result of a combination of ecological turmoil, human hunting, and human-driven landscape changes.

Cultural significance

Fossil evidence
Despite the role that the first Aboriginal Australians are speculated to have had in the extinction of Diprotodon and other mammalian megafauna in Australia, there is a dearth of evidence that humans utilised them at all over the 20,000 years of coexistence. There have been no fossils of mammalian megafauna suggestive of human butchery or cooking.

In 1984, an upper right Diprotodon incisor (2I) bearing 28 visible cut marks was discovered in Spring Creek in southwestern Victoria by Gail Paton, and formally studied by Ron Vanderwald and Richard Fullager. The incisor was split in half longitudinally, seemingly while the bone was still fresh, but it was glued together before Vanderwald and Fullager could inspect it. Each piece measures  in length. They determined it was inconsistent with bite marks from scavenging Thylacoleo or mice, and concluded it was incised by humans with flint as a counting system or a random doodle. This specimen became one of the most cited pieces of evidence that humans and megafauna directly interacted, until a 2020 re-analysis by Australian palaeoanthropologist Michelle Langley identified the engraver as most likely a tiger quoll.

In 2016, Australian archaeologist Giles Hamm and colleagues unearthed a partial right radius belonging to a young Diprotodon in the Warratyi rock shelter. Because it lacks carnivore damage and the rock shelter is a pretty steep climb, they believed that humans were responsible for the bone ending up where it did.

Mythology

When the first massive fossils were dug up in Australia, it was not clear what animals they might have represented as there were no serious scientists on the continent, but locals guessed some may represent rhinos or elephants. The colonists, most vocally Reverend John Dunmore Lang, forwarded these fossils as evidence of the Genesis flood narrative. The Aboriginal Australians also attempted to fit the finds into their own religious ideas, quickly associating Diprotodon with the bunyip, a large carnivorous lake monster. Many ethnologists and palaeontologists of the time consequently believed the bunyip is a tribal memory of the lumbering giant which probably frequented marshlands (though at the time it was not entirely ruled out that the creature and other megafauna were still alive, as the land exploration of the continent was still ongoing.) Scientific investigation into the bunyip was stigmatised after a purported bunyip skull was sensationalised in 1846 (especially when put on display at the Australian Museum), until Owen the following year recognised it as the skull of a foal, surprised that the burgeoning Australian scientific community could have erred so egregiously. 

In 1892, Canadian geologist Henry Yorke Lyell Brown reported that Aboriginal Australians identified Diprotodon fossils from Lake Eyre as those of the Rainbow Serpent, which he thought was a giant, bottom-dwelling fish. This notion became somewhat popularised after English geologist John Walter Gregory (who believed the god was a horned and scaly creature) conjectured that it was a chimaera of Diprotodon (which he believed had a horn) and a crocodile. Later workers continued to report some link between the Rainbow Serpent and either Diprotodon or crocodiles.

These kinds of suppositions are not testable, and also require stories to survive oral tradition for tens of thousands of years. If Pleistocene megafauna are indeed the basis for some aboriginal mythology, it is unclear if the stories were based on the creatures when they were alive, or their fossils discovered long after they had died out.

Rock art

Aboriginal Australians decorated caves with paintings and drawings of several creatures, but the identities of the subjects are oftentimes unclear. In 1907, Australian anthropologist Herbert Basedow found footprint petroglyphs in Yunta Springs and Wilkindinna, which he believed represented those of Diprotodon. In 1988, Australian historian Percy Trezise presented what he thought was a Quinkan depiction of Diprotodon to the First Congress of the Australian Rock Art Research Association. Both of these claims have their faults as the supposed depictions bear several features inconsistent with what is known about Diprotodon. Furthermore, unlike the more naturalistic artwork of Early European modern humans (which are more easily identifiable as various animals), aboriginal artwork is much more stylistic and is by-and-large uninterpretable by an outsider. The subjects of aboriginal paintings can also be mythological beings from the Dreaming rather than a corporeal subject.

See also 
 Australian megafauna

Notes

References

External links

Further reading

 

Prehistoric vombatiforms
Pleistocene marsupials
Pleistocene mammals of Australia
Prehistoric marsupial genera
Fossil taxa described in 1838
Taxa named by Richard Owen
Prehistoric monotypic mammal genera